Michael Allan Zinberg (born March 22, 1944), is an American television director, producer and writer.

Early life and education 
Zinberg was born in Bexar County, Texas to Dorothy Zinberg (née Rissien) and William Zinberg.

Zinberg graduated from Thomas Jefferson High School in San Antonio, TX. In 1977, received a B.S. in radio-television-film from Moody College of Communication at the University of Texas at Austin.

Career 
Zinberg moved to Los Angeles, California, in 1968, with his first job as an usher at CBS Television City. He worked his way up to become a production assistant and then a writer, eventually working as an Associate Producer on the James Garner TV show Nichols.

In 1972, Zinberg joined the MTM Productions television production company that was founded by Mary Tyler Moore's husband, Grant Tinker. While at MTM Productions he wrote, produced and directed The Bob Newhart Show for six seasons, as well as The Mary Tyler Moore Show, among other popular TV shows of the 1970s and 1980s.

From 1979 to 1981, Zinberg was VP Production Development at NBC, where he was responsible for Hill Street Blues, Cheers, as well as other programs.

From 1993 to 1995, Zinberg was President of NBC Productions, where he oversaw Homicide: Life on the Street, JAG, and all NBC Late Night programming.

Zinberg continues to produce direct many episodic TV programs, including Rizzoli & Isles, where he serves as Executive Producer. He has directed current shows like The Good Wife, The Blacklist, and NCIS: New Orleans, among others. He counts  John Rich, John Frankenheimer, Bob Butler, and Gene Reynolds as inspiration for his directing work.

Personal life 
Zinberg has been married to Leslie Zinberg (née Fierman), a writer and designer, since 1969.

Filmography 
Selected work
 1971–1972: Nichols - Assistant Producer, 24 episodes
 1972–1974: The Mary Tyler Moore Show - Associate Producer, 24 episodes; Assistant Producer, 24 episodes
 1972–1978: The Bob Newhart Show - Associate Producer, 75 episodes; Producer, 33 episodes; Executive Producer, 22 episodes; Director, 15 episodes
 1976–1978: The Tony Randall Show - Director, 5 episodes
 1982–1983: Taxi - Director, 6 episodes
 1978–1979: WKRP in Cincinnati - Director, 4 episodes
 1983–1984: The Yellow Rose - Executive Producer, 22 episodes
 1987–1988: L.A. Law - Director, 2 episodes
 1989–1990: Midnight Caller - Director - 3 episodes
 1990–1991: Quantum Leap - Co-Executive Producer, 24 episodes; Director, 9 episodes
 1996–1998: JAG - Co-Executive Producer, 7 episodes; Director, 2 episodes
 1996–1997: Men Behaving Badly - Director, 16 episodes
 1999–2002: Everybody Loves Raymond - Director, 5 episodes
 1999–2004: The Practice - Director, 8 episodes
 2003–2009: Monk - Director, 5 episodes
 2003–2023: NCIS - Director, 23 episodes 
 2004–2005: Gilmore Girls - Director, 6 episodes
 2008–2010: Private Practice - Director, 5 episodes
 2009–2010: Lie to Me - Director, 4 episodes
 2010–2011: Rizzoli & Isles - Executive Producer, 15 episodes; Director, 5 episodes
 2010–2016: The Good Wife - Director, 15 episodes
 2012–2013: 90210 - Director, 4 episodes
 2013: Franklin & Bash - Director, 1 episode
 2014: The Michael J. Fox Show - Director, 1 episode
 2014: Star-Crossed - Director, 1 episode
 2014: The Blacklist - Director, 2 episodes 
 2014–2016: Agents of S.H.I.E.L.D. - Director, 2 episodes
 2014–2019: NCIS: New Orleans - Director, 13 episodes
 2015–2016: The Carmichael Show - Director, 3 episodes
 2015–2016: Aquarius - Director, 3 episodes
 2015–2016: Rosewood - Director, 2 episodes 
 2017: Young Sheldon - Director, 2 episodes
 2017–2018: The Good Fight - Director, 2 episodes
 2020: Evil - Director, 1 episode

Honors

Emmys 
 1977: Outstanding Comedy Series, The Bob Newhart Show (CBS)
 1991: Outstanding Drama Series, Quantum Leap (NBC)
 1992: Outstanding Drama Series, Quantum Leap (NBC)

Zinberg has won the following awards and has served on the following bodies:
 The Lifetime Achievement Award from The Caucus of Writers, Producers and Directors
 Board Member, The Western Directors Council
 Co-Chair of the DGA Television Creative Rights Committee
 1983: The Young Texas Exes Award, University of Texas at Austin
 1994: The College of Communication Outstanding Alumnus Award, University of Texas at Austin
 UT College of Communication Foundation Advisory Council, University of Texas at Austin

References

External links 

American television directors
American television producers
American television writers
American male television writers
Living people
University of Texas at Austin College of Liberal Arts alumni
Place of birth missing (living people)
Directors Guild of America Award winners
1944 births